Philip Larkin: Life, Art and Love is a book by James Booth about the poet Philip Larkin.  The book was first published in 2014.

References

2014 non-fiction books
Bloomsbury Publishing books
Philip Larkin